Neuperlach Zentrum is an U-Bahn station in Munich, Germany, on the U5.

References

External links

Munich U-Bahn stations
Railway stations in Germany opened in 1980
1980 establishments in West Germany
Ramersdorf-Perlach